Rui Nuno de Oliveira Garcia da Rocha (born 13 March 1970) is a Portuguese politician who is a member of the Assembly of the Republic and the President of the Liberal Initiative since 22 January 2023.

Biography
Born in Lobito, Portuguese Angola, Rocha moved to Braga as a child. He is married and has two children. He graduated with a law degree from the Catholic University of Portugal in Porto and was a guest assistant on law courses at the Moderna University. He works as a lawyer, legal consultant and director of human resources, in the fields of construction, motoring, finance and specialised retail.

Rocha joined the Liberal Initiative in August 2020. He worked on Tiago Mayan Gonçalves's campaign in the 2021 Portuguese presidential election. In the 2022 Portuguese legislative election, he was the party's lead candidate in the Braga District and was elected.

Endorsed by outgoing leader João Cotrim de Figueiredo, Rocha was voted party leader on 22 January 2023. He received 51.7% of the votes from 2,300 party members. He set the target of reaching 15% in the next Portuguese legislative election, and declared that he would only work with the Social Democratic Party if that party would not ally with Chega.

See also 

 Liberalism in Portugal

References

External links
Rui Rocha at Assembly of the Republic (in Portuguese)

Liberal Initiative people
Members of the Assembly of the Republic (Portugal)
Catholic University of Portugal alumni
1970 births
Living people
People from Braga
People from Benguela Province
20th-century Portuguese lawyers
21st-century Portuguese lawyers